The 2017–18 season is Raja Casablanca's 69th season in existence and the club's 62nd consecutive season in the top flight of Moroccan football. It covers a period from 1 July 2017 to 30 June 2018.

Overview

Pre-season

August

Current squad

 Head coach: Juan Carlos Garrido
 Assistant-coach: Mohammed Adil Erradi

Transfers

In (summer)

Out (Summer)

In (winter)

Out (winter)

Pre-season and friendlies

Competitions

Oreview

Botola

League table

Results summary

Result round by round

Matches

Moroccan Throne Cup

Round of 32

Round of 16

Quarter-finals

Semi-finals

Final

CAF Confederation Cup

Statistics

Squad statistics
Last updated on 2 November 2017.

|-
! colspan=12 style=background:#dcdcdc; text-align:center|Goalkeepers

|-
! colspan=12 style=background:#dcdcdc; text-align:center|Defenders

|-
! colspan=12 style=background:#dcdcdc; text-align:center|Midfielders

|-
! colspan=12 style=background:#dcdcdc; text-align:center|Forwards

|-
|}

Goalscorers

References

External links

Raja CA seasons
Raja Casablanca